ASL Airlines Spain, formerly PAN Air Líneas Aéreas S.A., was a cargo airline based at Madrid–Barajas International Airport, Spain. Its main hub was at Madrid–Barajas International Airport with small hubs at Barcelona–El Prat, Seville, Valencia, Vitoria and Zaragoza.

The airline mainly operated on the TNT Express European Network. It also provided ad hoc charters.

History 
PAN Air was established in 1987 and started operations in December 1988. The airline was formerly owned by TNT Express Spain. On 5 February 2016 ASL Aviation Group announced it had agreed to purchase PAN Air on the condition that FedEx takes over TNT Express. PAN Air was later renamed ASL Airlines Spain.

ASL Airlines Spain ceased operations in August 2018.

Fleet
The ASL Airlines Spain fleet consisted of the following aircraft (as of September 2016):

See also
 ASL Airlines Belgium
 ASL Airlines France
 ASL Airlines Hungary
 ASL Airlines Ireland 
 ASL Airlines Switzerland

References

External links

 ASL Airlines Spain

Defunct airlines of Spain
Airlines established in 1987
Airlines disestablished in 2018